Hoseo (literally "west of the lake") is a region coinciding with the former Chungcheong Province in what is now South Korea. Today, the term refers to Daejeon, Sejong City, South Chungcheong and North Chungcheong Provinces. Hoseo people use Chungcheong dialect. The name is often used to refer to people residing in the region. Nowadays Chungcheong is more frequently used instead of Hoseo. The region will host the World University Summer Games in 2027.

See also
 Daejeon
 Sejong City
 North Chungcheong Province
 South Chungcheong Province
 Regions of Korea

References

Regions of Korea